Oleh Dmytrovych Rodin (born 6 April 1956) is a former Soviet football player and Ukrainian youth manager. He was one of the very few players who got called up to the USSR national team from a Soviet First League (second level) club team.

International career
Rodin made his debut for USSR on 21 November 1979 in a friendly against West Germany.

External links
  Profile
 

1956 births
Footballers from Moscow
Living people
Russian footballers
Soviet footballers
Soviet Union international footballers
FC Karpaty Lviv players
FC Dynamo Moscow players
Soviet Top League players
Association football defenders
Ukrainian football managers